Long Line is the fourth solo album by Peter Wolf, released in 1996. The album marked a shift in Wolf's music from pop rock to a bluesier rock with more personal, introspective lyrics. It had been six years since the release of his previous album, the delay largely due to legal problems with his previous record company MCA. In the interim, Wolf performed gigs in the Boston area with his band Houseparty Five, who then served as the backing band on his tour for this album under the name The Street Ensemble.

Track listing
"Long Line" (Angelo Petraglia, Stu Kimball, Wolf) - 3:33
"Romeo Is Dead" (Will Jennings, Wolf) - 3:24
"Rosie" (Taylor Rhodes, Wolf) - 4:26
"Forty to One" (Aimee Mann, Wolf) - 3:00
"Goodbye (Is All I'll Send Her)" (Kimball, Wolf) - 3:54
"Wastin' Time" (Wolf) - 4:16
"Sky High" (Jennings, Wolf) - 3:45
"Two Loves" (Wolf) - 3:30
"Break This Chain" (Robert White Johnson, Rhodes, Wolf) - 4:46
"Seventh Heaven" (Johnson, Rhodes, Wolf) - 3:47
"Starvin' to Death" (Mann, Wolf) - 3:27
"Riverside Drive" (Wolf) - 5:25

Personnel
Peter Wolf - harmonica, vocals
Beth A. - background vocals
Johnny A. - guitars, baritone guitar
Tim Archibald - bass
Patty Barkas - vocals, background vocals
Tom Belliveau - pedal steel
Bradley Delp - background vocals
Doug Dube - organ
Charlie Farren - background vocals
Ken Field - flute, saxophone
Stuart Kimball - organ, guitar
Matt Leavenworth - fiddle
Brian Maes - keyboard, background vocals
Holly Palmer - background vocals
Tom Soares - background vocals
David Stefanelli - percussion, drums
Bird Taylor - background vocals
Buck Taylor - background vocals
Bob Tudor - keyboard

Production
Producers: Peter Wolf, Johnny A., Stu Kimball
Assistant producer: Jessie Henderson
Engineer: Tom Soares
Assistant engineer: Dave Kirkpatrick
Assistant engineer: Ted Paduck
Assistant engineer: Marc LaFleur
Mixing: Phil Greene, Tom Soares
Mixing assistant: Brenda Ferry
Mastering: Bob Ludwig
Art direction: Linda Cobb
Design: Linda Cobb
Photography: Johnny A., Nancy Hodgins, David Seltzer
Illustrations: Peter Wolf
Grooming: Heidi Wells
Personal Assistant: Mimi Fox, Scott 'Mitch' Mitchell

Notes 

Peter Wolf albums
1996 albums
Reprise Records albums